Oxford Games Ltd, incorporated in 1991, is an English board game company.

History 
Founded by Leslie Scott (the creator of Jenga), and the graphic designer, Sara Finch. Finch & Scott co-designed Swipe and The Great Western Railway Game (published by Gibsons Games) in 1985, and then went on to develop and design almost forty games together. Most were published and marketed through Oxford Games Ltd, though there were several that were designed to commission for other companies such as Past Times, and still others that were endorsed by institutions, such as the Ashmolean Museum.

Oxford Games 
The collection of games published by the company comprises over thirty games, including

 Ex Libris, endorsed by the Bodleian Library and the British Library
 Anagram
 Tabula
 Bookworm, endorsed by the Bodleian Library
 Playing Shakespeare, endorsed by the Royal Shakespeare Company
 The Game of Garden Maze
 Inspiration, endorsed by the Fitzwilliam Museum
 The Hieroglyphs Game, endorsed by the Ashmolean Museum

References

External links 
 Official website

Game manufacturers